Simple Loop Prevention Protocol (SLPP) in computer networking is a data link layer protocol developed by Nortel (previously acquired by Avaya, now a part of Extreme Networks) to protect against Layer 2 network loops. SLPP uses a small hello packet to detect network loops. The SLPP protocol checks packets from the originating switch and the peer switch in a SMLT configuration. Sending hello packets on a per VLAN basis allows SLPP to detect VLAN based network loops for un-tagged as well as tagged IEEE 802.1Q VLAN link configurations. If a loop is detected, the associated port is shut down.

Compatible equipment
 Avaya VSP 9000 Series - Software version 3.0 or above
 Avaya VSP 7000 Series - Software version 10.0 or above
 Avaya ERS 8600 - Software version 4.1 or above
 Avaya ERS-8300 - Software version 4.0 or above
 Avaya ERS-5000 - Software version 6.3 or above
 Avaya ERS 4000 series - Software version 5.6.2 or above
 Avaya ERS-3500 - Software version 5.2.0 or above

See also
 VLACP

References

Further reading 
 
 Simple Loop Prevention Protocol Google Patents
 Simple Loop Prevention Protocol (SLPP)
 Nortel "Simple Loop Prevention Protocol" (SLPP)
 Switch Clustering Design Best Practices
 Quick Nortel MLT (Link Aggregation) Reference
 Switch Clustering Design Best Practices

External links

 Switch Clustering using Split Multi-Link Trunking (SMLT) with ERS 8600, 8300, 5x00 and 1600 Series Technical Configuration Guide

Avaya
Nortel protocols
Link protocols